Fender Buttress is a rock buttress rising to more than , projecting from the south side of Herbert Plateau into the head of Drygalski Glacier, Graham Land. 

It was mapped from surveys by the Falkland Islands Dependencies Survey (1960–61), and was named by the UK Antarctic Place-Names Committee for Guillaume Fender of Buenos Aires, the inventor of an early type of track-laying vehicle (British Patent of 1882, taken out by John C. Mewburn).

References 

Rock formations of Graham Land
Danco Coast